Cecilia Smith (born 13 March 1994) is an Australian rugby union player. She plays for the Queensland Reds in the Super W competition.

Smith was named in Australia's squad for the 2022 Pacific Four Series in New Zealand. She made her international debut for the Wallaroos against New Zealand on 12 June at Tauranga. She was named in the Australian squad for a two-test series against the Black Ferns at the Laurie O'Reilly Cup.

In October 2022, Smith made her first Rugby World Cup appearance at the delayed tournament in New Zealand.

References

External links
Wallaroos Profile

1994 births
Living people
Australia women's international rugby union players
Australian female rugby union players
21st-century Australian women